Lucky Eleven Records was a record label started in 1959 in Flint, Michigan by Otis Ellis and Chuck Slaughter. The independent label later became distributed by Philadelphia-based Cameo-Parkway Records which featured the Flint-based pop band Terry Knight and the Pack. The Lucky Eleven and Cameo-Parkway recordings are now owned by ABKCO Records..a re-issue label which includes the re-release of Cameo-Parkway product.

See also 
 List of record labels

External links
Official site from ABKCO Records

Defunct record labels of the United States
Record labels established in 1959